Cordova Jr/Sr High School, also known as Cordova High School (CHS) is a joint junior and senior high school located in Cordova, Alaska. It serves grades seven through twelve. It is a part of the Cordova School District.

References

External links
 Cordova Wolverines

Buildings and structures in Chugach Census Area, Alaska
Cordova, Alaska
Educational institutions in the United States with year of establishment missing
Public middle schools in Alaska
Public high schools in Alaska
Schools in Unorganized Borough, Alaska